Burton Court may refer to:

Places

United Kingdom
Burton Court, Eardisland, a wedding and conference venue in north Herefordshire
Burton Court, Linton, a grade II listed house in south Herefordshire
Burton’s Court, a park in Chelsea, London